The following outline is provided as an overview of and topical guide to military science:

Military science – study of the technique, psychology, practice and other phenomena which constitute war and armed conflict. It strives to be a scientific system that if properly employed, will greatly enhance the practitioner's ability to prevail in an armed conflict with any adversary. To this end, it is unconcerned whether that adversary is an opposing military force, guerrillas or other irregulars, or any adversary who knows of or utilizes military science in response.

Topics within military science
 Military organization
 Military education and training
 Military history
 Military geography
 Military technology and equipment
 Military strategy and doctrine
 Intelligence cycle management
 Foreign policy analysis
 Diplomacy

Types of military technology

Weapon
 Armour – protective clothing intended to defend its wearer from intentional harm in combat and military engagements, typically associated with soldiers
 Artillery – large caliber weapons firing projectiles one at a time.  Artillery pieces are crew serviced weapons that provide direct or indirect trajectories for the shell
 Medieval siege weaponry
 Fortifications – military constructions and buildings designed for defense in warfare–
 Martial arts – also known as fighting systems, martial arts are bodies of codified practices or traditions of training for unarmed and armed combat, usually without the use of guns and other modern weapons–
 Mêlée – hand-to-hand combat or mano-a-mano; weapons commonly used in mêlée include swords, clubs, spears, axes, or fists: almost any tool with which one can hit someone else
 Military vehicles – are land combat or transportation vehicles, excluding rail-based, which are designed for or in significant use by military forces
 Armoured fighting vehicle
 Armoured personnel carrier
 Tank
 Military aviation and military aircraft – Military aviation include such areas as transport, bombing, surveillance, and aerial warfare
 Military communications – the transmission medium that links military components on the battlefield
Communications
Military engineer
 Military robots – autonomous or remote-controlled devices designed for military applications
Unmanned Ground Vehicles
Unmanned Combat Air Vehicles
Unmanned Undersea Vehicles
 Military thought and planning – military tactics, strategy, and doctrine
 Military doctrine – level of military planning between national strategy and unit-level
 Military strategy – collective name for planning the conduct of warfare
 Military tactics – collective name for methods of engaging and defeating an enemy in battle
 Military unit – an organization within an armed force. It may consist of any number of soldiers, ships, vehicles, or aircraft. Armies, navies, and air forces, are organised hierarchically into groups of various sizes for functional, tactical and administrative purposes
Military rank
Comparative military ranks
 Munitions – often defined as a synonym for ammunition. A slightly broader definition would include bombs, missiles, warheads, and mines
Bullet
Missile
Bomb
Mine
Landmine
Naval mine
 Naval warfare – combat in and on seas and oceans
 Navy
 Naval ship
 Submarine
 Small arms and firearms – a firearm is a kinetic energy weapon that fires either a single or multiple projectiles propelled at high velocity by the gases produced by action of the rapid confined burning of a propellant

Military by region

 List of militaries by country
 List of air forces
 List of armies by country
 List of navies
 List of military special forces units
 List of countries by military expenditures
 List of countries by number of active troops
 List of countries by size of armed forces
 List of countries without an army

History of military science and technology

Military history

By historical period
 Prehistoric warfare
 Ancient warfare
 Medieval warfare
 Gunpowder warfare
 Industrial warfare
 Total war
 Irregular warfare
 Modern warfare

By battlespace

 Air power history
 History of aerial warfare
 Army history
 History of land warfare
 History of information warfare
 History of espionage
 Nuclear espionage
 Atomic spies
 History of surveillance
 Naval history
 History of naval warfare
 History of space warfare

By terrain

 History of arctic warfare
 History of cyber-warfare
 History of desert warfare
 History of jungle warfare
 History of mountain warfare
 History of urban warfare

By weapon technology

 History of armoured warfare
 History of artillery
 History of biological warfare
 History of cavalry
 History of chemical warfare
 History of electronic warfare
 History of infantry
 History of mechanized warfare
 History of sea-based and land-based mine warfare
 History of nuclear warfare
 History of nuclear weapons
 History of psychological warfare
 History of radiological warfare
 History of ski warfare
 History of submarine warfare

History of military tactics

 History of amphibious warfare
 History of asymmetric warfare
 History of attrition warfare
 History of cavalry tactics
 History of conventional warfare
 History of fortification
 History of guerrilla warfare
 History of hand to hand combat
 History of invasion
 History of joint warfare
 History of maneuver warfare
 Siege warfare
 Total warfare
 Trench warfare
 History of unconventional warfare

History of military strategy

 History of economic warfare
 History of grand strategy
 History of operational warfare

General military science and technology concepts
 Aircraft
 Bomber
 Fighter aircraft
 Aircraft carrier
 Air superiority
 Basic training
 Battlespace
 Defense
 Draft
 Exchange officer
 Maginot line
 Militaria
 Military Aid to the Civil Power
 Military Aid to the Civil Community
 Military academy
 Military courtesy
 Military fiat
 Military history
 Military incompetence
 Military logistics
 Junta
 Military organization
 Military rule (disambiguation)
 Military science
 Military tactics
 Military technology and equipment
 Mutually assured destruction (MAD)
 Napalm
 Nuclear missile
 SLBM
 ICBM
 MIRV
 Tactical nuclear weapon
 Radar
 Recruiting
 Sonar
 Strategic Bombing
 Troop density
 War crime (list)
 Crimes against humanity
 Genocide
 Mass murder
 War rape

Influential military strategists

Following are examples from throughout history of prominently influential military strategists:

 Cyrus the Great
 Sun Tzu – Chinese military general, strategist, and philosopher during the Zhou dynasty's Spring and Autumn Period. He is traditionally credited as the author of The Art of War, an extremely influential ancient Chinese book on military strategy.
 Sun Bin
 Chanakya
 Alexander the Great
 Chandragupta Maurya
 Hannibal
 Qin Shi Huang
 Julius Caesar
 Marcus Vipsanius Agrippa
 Zhuge Liang
 Khalid ibn al-Walid
 Genghis Khan
 Gustavus Adolphus of Sweden
 Frederick the Great
 Napoleon Bonaparte
 Arthur Wellesley, 1st Duke of Wellington
 Gebhard Leberecht von Blücher
 Antoine-Henri Jomini
 Nathan Bedford Forrest
 Carl von Clausewitz – German-Prussian soldier and military theorist who stressed the psychological and political aspects of war. His ideas have been widely influential in military theory and have had a strong influence on German military thought specifically.
 Robert E. Lee
 Ulysses S. Grant
 William Tecumseh Sherman
 Helmuth von Moltke the Elder
 Alfred von Schlieffen
 Hans Delbrück
 Alfred Thayer Mahan
 Ferdinand Foch
 Giulio Douhet
 Billy Mitchell
 J. F. C. Fuller
 B. H. Liddell Hart
 Hans von Seeckt
 Heinz Guderian
 Erwin Rommel
 Alan Brooke, 1st Viscount Alanbrooke
 Bernard Montgomery, 1st Viscount Montgomery of Alamein
 George Marshall
 Dean Acheson

Military science and technology lists
 List of countries by military expenditures
 List of countries by number of active troops
 List of countries by size of armed forces
 List of countries without an army
 List of air forces
 List of navies
 List of armies
 List of battles

See also

 Outline of war
 Military science fiction

External links 

 Collection of military handbooks etc. (archived)

Military science
Military science

Military science

tk:Harby ylym we tehnologiýa meýilnama